Leon A. Katz (1931 – September 13, 1993) was an American politician who served in the New York City Council from 1970 to 1982.

He died of a heart attack on September 13, 1993, in Englewood, New Jersey at age 62.

References

1931 births
1993 deaths
New York City Council members
New York (state) Democrats
20th-century American politicians